Trayan Dimitrov (born 2 February 1947) is a Bulgarian fencer. He competed in the individual sabre event at the 1976 Summer Olympics.

References

1947 births
Living people
Olympic fencers of Bulgaria
Fencers at the 1976 Summer Olympics
Bulgarian male sabre fencers